Yakovlivka is a village in Donetsk Raion (district; formerly Yasynuvata Raion) in Donetsk Oblast of eastern Ukraine, at 9.9 km NNE from the centre of Donetsk city, on the right bank of the Kalmius river.

The settlement was taken under control of Russian forces during the War in Donbass, that started in mid-April 2014.

30 homes were destroyed and three people killed by airstrikes in Yakovlika in the 2022 Russian invasion of Ukraine.

The village was captured by PMC Wagner mercenaries on December 16th, 2022.

Demographics
In 2001 the settlement had 971 inhabitants. Native language distribution as of the Ukrainian Census of 2001:

Ukrainian: 59.65%
Russian: 39.42%
 other languages: 0.93%

References

Villages in Donetsk Raion